Morrison Creek station is a Sacramento RT light rail in Sacramento, California.

The station platform was built as part of extension of the Blue Line to Cosumnes River College that opened in August 2015, but Morrison Creek station did not open at that time. The station was planned in anticipation of the construction of transit-oriented development next to the site, and includes a 75-space park and ride lot and a bus transfer area, but currently the area is undeveloped and the station site is not connected to any nearby roads.

The station remained untouched until 2021, when SacRT was faced a deadline to use federal funding allocated to the project. The agency added missing amenities to the station including shelters and benches, and made it into a "walk-on" station, meaning it is only accessible by bicycle and pedestrian paths.

Because of expected low patronage, the station is a "request stop" with riders needing to press a button on the platform to signal trains to stop.

References 

Sacramento Regional Transit light rail stations
Railway stations in the United States opened in 2021